David Forde (born 1981) is an Irish sportsperson.  He plays hurling with his local club Clarinbridge and is a member of the Galway senior team.

External links
 David Forde on hurlingstats.com

1981 births
Living people
Clarinbridge hurlers
Galway inter-county hurlers
Connacht inter-provincial hurlers